Right Where You Want Me is the second studio album by American singer-songwriter Jesse McCartney, released in the US on September 19, 2006.

Album information
Right Where You Want Me debuted at number 15 on the US Albums chart, beating the first week sales of McCartney's first album Beautiful Soul. The album sold less than 300,000 copies in the United States and sold over 600,000 copies worldwide going Gold in Taiwan & Italy accounts to over 100,000 of the sales.

The first single of the same name was not as successful as his debut single "Beautiful Soul", peaking at number thirty-three on the US Billboard Hot 100. The video for his second single "Just So You Know" was shot and officially released, though the single never received a full release in the US due to lack of support from his current record label, as stated in an email from Sherry Kondor, one of Jesse's managers. It did chart in several European countries though. Following the low support, Jesse went back to the studios again writing and recording for his third album.

Track listing

Personnel
Kenny Aronoff - drums
Jeff Bova - drum programming, string arrangements
Paul Buckmaster - conductor, string arrangements
David J. Carpenter - bass guitar
Andy Dodd - acoustic guitar, electric guitar, keyboards, piano, drum programming, background vocals
Marti Frederiksen - bass guitar, drums, acoustic guitar, keyboards, percussion
Darin James - drums
Emanuel Kiriakou - bass guitar, bouzouki, drum programming, acoustic guitar, electric guitar, keyboards, percussion, piano, background vocals
Robbie Kondor - piano
Dory Lobel - acoustic guitar, electric guitar
Jesse McCartney - lead vocals, background vocals
Suzie McNeil - background vocals
Jamie Muhoberac - keyboards
Pino Palladino - bass guitar
Tim Pierce - electric guitar
Drew Ramsey - bass guitar, electric guitar, drum programming, background vocals
Mikal Reid - electric guitar
Jeff Rothschild - drums
Shannon Sanders - keyboards, drum programming, synthesizer, background vocals
John Shanks - bass guitar, acoustic guitar, electric guitar, keyboards, background vocals
Shari Sutcliffe- string contractor
Pat Thrall - drum programming
Adam Watts - drums, acoustic guitar, electric guitar, keyboards, drum programming, background vocals
Greg Wells - bass guitar, drums, piano

Charts and certifications

Certifications

Release history

References

2006 albums
Hollywood Records albums
Jesse McCartney albums
Albums produced by John Shanks
Albums produced by Emanuel Kiriakou